Captain Underpants and the Sensational Saga of Sir Stinks-A-Lot is the twelfth and final book in the Captain Underpants series, written and illustrated by Dav Pilkey. The book continues after the eleventh book as George, Harold, and their clones switch places, only to find their gym teacher Mr. Meaner has become Sir Stinks-A-Lot, who turns his students into slaves. The boys team up with their adult counterparts to save the world.

Plot
A message from Dav Pilkey informs those reading that, unlike previous books which appealed to both adults and children, this book will attempt to appeal to solely children, for their safety and the pleasure of older readers.

On the planet called "Smart Earth", a scientist mixes smart Diet Coke, smart Pop Rocks, and smart Mentos, and this experiment causes Smart Earth to explode. One chunk lands in a grape garden, causing the grapes to become smart. They try to wage war on humans but dry out. Another chunk lands at the Piqua Valley Home for the Reality-Challenged. Gym teacher Mr. Meaner eats a chunk and becomes smart. He tries to walk out, but two doctors block his way. He confuses them, so he and the other teachers escape and return to their jobs. Mr. Meaner takes control of an abandoned factory, and he makes a strange substance with sweaty gym socks called the Rid-o-Kid 2000. Yesterday George and Harold are told to go to his office, where he sprays them with Rid-o-Kid 2000, turning them into robot-like slaves. The other teachers are amazed at their behavior, though the other George and Harold are not, and they get sicker because of excessive homework. They see a commercial for the “Rid-o-Kid 2000” and disguise themselves as adults, making the children do fun activities for the teachers. The teachers call in Mr. Meaner, who, enraged at what he sees, dons his "Kid Killer 2000", now a robotic exoskeleton suit.

Deciding to seek help from adults they can trust, George and Harold go to their parents, only to find that they are happy with how their children have changed. Feeling heartbroken, they go to brainiac Melvin Sneevly's house to find his Robo-Squid, then travel forward in time to find the older versions of Yesterday George and Harold, now famous graphic novel writers, and their families, with whom they are also disappointed. The older Yesterday and younger Today versions of George and Harold travel back in time to find Mr. Krupp. The older George and Harold tried to snap their fingers, but as he had been washing his face, he can not turn into Captain Underpants, and Mr. Meaner beats them up anyway. Once Mr. Krupp dries his face, they snap their fingers and turn him into Captain Underpants, defeating Mr. Meaner and sending him to prison.

After eating an egg salad sandwich with pickle relish and radioactive waste, Mr. Meaner turns into a gigantic blob dubbed Sir Stinks-A-Lot and causes havoc downtown. Captain Underpants returns to fight him back, but when Older George and Harold are captured and absorbed, Sir Stinks-A-Lot discovers Captain Underpants' weakness and turns him back into Mr. Krupp by splashing water from Franz Pond on him, making him fall. He then drains Krupp's Captain Underpants powers with his own after scanning his DNA, taking the effects of the 3D Hypno Ring as well. He runs off screaming as Older George and Harold telepathically call for Tony, Orlando, Dawn, Sulu, and Crackers' children. They feed Mr. Meaner Mentos, Diet Coke, and Pop Rocks, making him explode. Luckily, the three hamsterdactyls and Older George and Harold are unharmed, as well as Mr. Meaner, who has returned to normal.

Things are back to the way they were, and as young Today George and Harold return their older Yesterday counterparts to their own time, they find that Mr. Krupp's hypnosis effects have indeed worn off. Aside from Harold's initial confusion; he, George, and their older counterparts do not seem to care in the slightest. They decide, given there are a George and Harold to cover for them, they will use Melvin's time machine to find their pets Crackers and Sulu. The younger Yesterday George and Harold wake up to find that Tony, Orlando, Dawn, George, and Harold are gone. They go back to their treehouse. Yesterday Harold feels that he and Yesterday George should make another Captain Underpants comic book, but Yesterday George decides that they should do a comic book featuring Dog Man instead, concluding the Captain Underpants series which would then be followed up with Dog Man.

Comic: Dog Man: The Bark Knight Cometh 
This is an excerpt of a comic written and drawn by George and Harold's older future selves, following a more mature graphic novel art style reminiscent of Scott Pilgrim.

Dog Man, a police officer with a dog head, attacks two police officers, then unmasks himself as the evil Petey the Cat. He tries to attack with his sword, but Dog Man – as his superhero alter ego, "The Bark Knight" – dives toward Petey from above and breaks his sword with his bone numb-chucks. The two engage in a fight, and Petey shoots hand rockets at Dog Man, revealing himself as the robotic Mecha-Petey. He assaults Dog Man until another officer named Milly kicks Mecha-Petey in the face, removing it and exposing him as Flippy, an angelfish.

Characters
 George Beard and Harold Hutchins – Two mischievous best friends who are fourth-graders at Jerome Horwitz Elementary School.
 Yesterday George and Yesterday Harold – George and Harold's doubles, who were created from yesterday in the previous book.
 Mr. and Mrs. Beard - George's parents.
 Mrs. Hutchins - Harold's mom.
 Harold's sister - This is her second and final appearance in the series, following Book 8.
 Old George and Old Harold – George and Harold's future counterparts.
 Mr. Krupp – Principal of Jerome Horwitz elementary school.
 Captain Underpants – Mr. Krupp's superhero counterpart. He is later erased from existence by Sir Stinks-a-Lot.
 Mr. Meaner / Sir Stinks-A-Lot – George and Harold's mean gym teacher who is the main antagonist of this book.
 Tony, Orlando, and Dawn – Three super hamsterdactyls and the offspring of Sulu and Crackers.
 Melvin Sneedly – George and Harold's nemesis.
 Ms. Ribble – George and Harold's English teacher.
 Miss Anthrope – The secretary of Jerome Horwitz Elementary School.
 Miss Anita Calculator – George and Harold's math teacher.
 Mr. Rected – The school guidance counselor.
 Mr. Rustworthy – The school's music teacher.
 Miss Labler – The school psychologist.
 Ms. Guided – A teacher.
 Miss Fitt – Another teacher.
 Ms. Zurry - Another teacher.
 Ms. Dayken – Another teacher.
 Warden Gordon Bordon Schmorden – The jailer of Piqua State Penitentiary.
 Mrs. Beard – George's future wife.
 Billy – Harold's future husband.
 Meena and Nik - George's future children. They are mixed-race.
 Owen and Kei - Harold's future adopted children.
 Smart Earth Residents

Controversy 
Captain Underpants and the Sensational Saga of Sir Stinks-A-Lot revealed the co-protagonist, Harold, to be gay. The plot of the novel shows the two protagonists, George and Harold, meet themselves in the future. Future George is married to a woman and Harold is married to a man, each couple with two children. LGBTQ+ news reporter, Steven Frank, commended the unostentatious nature of the book's gay representation, deeming the move “big step forward for kid’s lit.” In October 2015, some elementary schools banned the book due to the inclusion of a gay character.

References

External links 
 Dav Pilkey's website
 Trailer at Scholastic's website

Captain Underpants novels
2015 American novels
Children's books with LGBT themes
LGBT-related controversies in literature
American LGBT novels
Blue Sky Press books